United Nations Security Council Resolution 13 was adopted on December 12, 1946.  After examining the application of Thailand for membership in the United Nations, the UN Security Council recommended to the General Assembly that Siam be admitted. It was adopted unanimously.

See also
 List of United Nations Security Council Resolutions 1 to 100 (1946–1953)

References
Text of the Resolution at undocs.org

External links
 

 0013
20th century in Thailand
1946 in Thailand
 0013
 0013
December 1946 events